Jackson is an unincorporated community in Cassia County in the U.S. state of Idaho. The Snake River flows immediately northwest of Jackson.

History
Jackson's population was 25 in 1909.

References

Burley, Idaho micropolitan area
Unincorporated communities in Cassia County, Idaho
Unincorporated communities in Idaho